David Allen Kocourek (August 20, 1937 – April 24, 2013) was an American gridiron football player.  He played college football at Wisconsin.

Career
As a professional, he played for the Winnipeg Blue Bombers of the Canadian Football League (CFL) in 1959, and then played for nine years as a tight end in the American Football League (AFL), from 1960 through 1965 for the Los Angeles/San Diego Chargers; for the AFL's Miami Dolphins in 1966; and for the AFL's Oakland Raiders in 1967 and 1968.  He caught 55 passes for 1,055 yards in 1961 for 19.2 yards per reception, helping the Chargers win their second straight AFL West title.  He was an AFL All-Star for four straight years, from 1961 through 1964, and was on the Charger team that defeated the Boston Patriots for the 1963 AFL Championship. He played in seven AFL Championship Games, the only man to do so; with the Chargers in 1960 and 1961, 1963, 1964 and 1965; and the Oakland Raiders in 1967 and 1968, winning one with each team.  He was selected second-team tight end on the American Football League All-Time Team. Kocourek participated in nine playoff games in a span of seven seasons, catching 15 passes for 257 yards and 2 touchdowns.

Kocourek served as a color commentator on NBC's AFL and NFL telecasts in the late 1960s and early 1970s, and teamed up with Mark Champion to broadcast Tampa Bay Buccaneers games on the radio in the late 1970s and early 1980s.

Kocourek died on April 24, 2013, in Marco Island, Florida after suffering from progressive dementia.   His brain has been donated to Boston University's Center for the Study of Traumatic Encephalopathy (CSTE) for further examination as part of the NFL's ongoing concussion study.

See More 
 List of American Football League players

References

1937 births
2013 deaths
American football tight ends
American players of Canadian football
American Football League announcers
Los Angeles Chargers players
Miami Dolphins players
National Football League announcers
Oakland Raiders players
San Diego Chargers players
Tampa Bay Buccaneers announcers
Winnipeg Blue Bombers players
Wisconsin Badgers football players
American Football League All-Star players
American Football League All-Time Team
Sportspeople from Chicago
Players of American football from Chicago
Players of Canadian football from Chicago
American Football League players